The South River is a  tidal channel in McIntosh County, Georgia, in the United States.  It connects the Darien River to its west with Doboy Sound, an arm of the Atlantic Ocean, to its east. It flows through an extensive saltmarsh complex, with Queens Island to the north and Wolf Island to the south.

See also
List of rivers of Georgia
Darien River (Georgia)
North River (Darien River)

References 

Rivers of Georgia (U.S. state)
Rivers of McIntosh County, Georgia